

Men 
This is a list of the top ten ski jumpers to represent Great Britain as measured by their longest jump in official competitions.

British record by chronological progression 
Notes: 

In competition only. 

Glynn Pedersen improved the record with both his first and second jumps on 1st September 2001.

Sam Bolton was aged 16 years and 98 days when he jumped 134.50m, making him the youngest person to hold the record.

Women 
The current record holder is Mani Cooper, whose longest jump is 77m at the FIS Alpen Cup in Seefeld, Austria, December 2020. Cooper competes in the Nordic Combined discipline.

References

Ski jumping in the United Kingdom
British records
Ski jumping